The John U. Nef Committee on Social Thought is one of several PhD-granting committees at the University of Chicago. It was started in 1941 by historian John Ulric Nef along with economist Frank Knight, anthropologist Robert Redfield, and University President Robert Maynard Hutchins.

The Committee
The committee is interdisciplinary and it is not centered on any specific topic; rather, the committee has, since its inception, drawn together noted academics and writers to "foster awareness of the permanent questions at the origin of all learned inquiry".

Noted members
Notable past members of the committee have included
 writers Saul Bellow, J. M. Coetzee, T. S. Eliot, and Adam Zagajewski
 political theorists Hannah Arendt, Allan Bloom, and Mark Lilla,
 classicist David Grene, 
 historians Marc Fumaroli, Marshall G. S. Hodgson, David Nirenberg, and Paul Wheatley,
 sociologist  Edward Shils, 
 sinologist Anthony C. Yu,
 anthropologist Victor Turner, 
 poet and philologist A. K. Ramanujan, 
 philosophers Vincent Descombes, Mircea Eliade, Leszek Kołakowski, Jacques Maritain, Yves Simon, Paul Ricoeur, Stephen Toulmin, and Jean-Luc Marion.
 economists Robert Fogel and Friedrich Hayek.
Eliot, Bellow, Coetzee, Hayek, and Fogel have been awarded Nobel prizes.

Current faculty
Current faculty include religion scholar Wendy Doniger, theologian David Tracy, sociologist Hans Joas, literary theorist Thomas Pavel, theorist of German literature David Wellbery, classicist James M. Redfield, philosopher and psychoanalyst Jonathan Lear, philosopher Robert B. Pippin, classicist Laura M. Slatkin, historian of science Lorraine Daston, physician and philosopher Leon Kass (former chairman of the President's Council on Bioethics), political theorist Nathan Tarcov, art historian Andrei Pop, poet Rosanna Warren, philosopher Gabriel Richardson Lear, historian Joel Isaac, historian Jonathan Levy, classicist Mark Payne, and political theorist Jennifer Pitts.

See also
Social theory

References

Website
Committee on Social Thought

External links
Guide to the University of Chicago John U. Nef Committee on Social Thought Records 1940-1984 at the University of Chicago Special Collections Research Center

 
University of Chicago faculty
University of Chicago
Social philosophy